Flotille 4F (abbreviated to 4F) is a French Aeronavale aircraft squadron based at Base Aéronavale de Lann Bihoué and equipped with three Northrop Grumman E-2C Hawkeye aircraft, these aircraft are operated from the aircraft carrier ''Charles de Gaulle.

Post-war history

The squadron was formed in July 1944 to operate the Douglas SBD Dauntless dive-bomber, it converted to the Grumman TBM-3E Avenger in October 1953. In 1959 the squadron re-equipped with the Breguet Alizé carrier-based anti-submarine aircraft, the squadron operated these aircraft until 1997.

Flotille 4F was re-formed on 10 March 2000 to operate three Northrop Grumman E-2C Hawkeye carried-based airborne early warning aircraft.

References

Bibliography

French Naval Aviation squadrons